CU-SeeMe is an Internet videoconferencing client. CU-SeeMe can make point to point video calls without a server or make multi-point calls through server software first called a "reflector" and later called a "conference server" or Multipoint Control Unit (MCU). Later commercial versions of CU-SeeMe could also make point-to-point or multi-point calls to other vendor's standard H.323 endpoints and servers.

History  

CU-SeeMe was originally written by Tim Dorcey of the Information Technology department at Cornell University. It was first developed for the Macintosh in 1992 and later for the Windows platform in 1994. Originally it was video-only with audio added in 1994 for the Macintosh and 1995 for Windows. CU-SeeMe's audio came from Maven, an audio-only client developed at the University of Illinois at Urbana-Champaign.

The platform was introduced to the public on April 26, 1993, as part of an NSF funded education project called the Global Schoolhouse.

In 1994 WXYC utilized CU-SeeMe to simulcast its signal to the net and so became the world's first internet radio station.

On June 20, 1995, now defunct London cable channel Channel One used CU-SeeMe to simulcast its programme Digital World on the Internet, becoming the first UK television programme to broadcast live on the web. The programme was frame-grabbed every 2 frames using a macro written in Windows by duo Thibault & Rav.

On Thanksgiving morning in 1995, World News Now was the first television program in the US to be broadcast live on the Internet, using a CU-SeeMe interface. Victor Dorff, a producer of WNN at the time, arranged to have the show simulcast on the Internet daily for a six-month trial period. CU-SeeMe was also used in a taped interview segment in which anchor Kevin Newman and Global Schoolhouse director and founder Dr. Yvonne Marie Andres discussed the future of computers in communication.

In March 1996, CU-SeeMe was used for the first ever live internet broadcast of a musical theatre performance with the production of Cowboys in Love: The Hank Plowplucker Story. The show was produced by The Ethereal Mutt, and the stream was a partnership between Emutt and the CIS staff at Arizona State University.

The Internet Phone Connection, written by Cheryl L. Kirk was one of the first consumer books to feature CU-SeeMe. The book outlined how to use the program to communicate across the globe.

CU-SeeMe 2.x was released as a commercial product in 1995 through an agreement with Cornell University.  The full commercial licensing rights were transferred to White Pine Software in 1998.

Decline 
While not directly competing against hardware-assisted video-conferencing companies, it suffered in that the nascent market was expecting hardware quality audio and video when CPUs of that time weren't really ready to support that quality level in software. Early wide acceptance of CU-SeeMe outside of the hobbyist market was limited by its relatively poor audio/video quality and excessive latency. While the commercial and freeware products were useful to hobbyists, CU-SeeMe and its accompanying server product were beginning to build a following in education - with up to 40% of commercial sales from educational establishments. A spinoff application called ClassPoint which was based on CU-SeeMe and the conference server was released commercially in 1998.  It was an early attempt to add features to a real-time collaboration product specifically designed for K-12 education users.

The United States military was a large customer of the technology, making use of the CU-SeeMe Conference Server MCU for many applications,  including using the T.120 server for Microsoft NetMeeting endpoints.

White Pine locked out users of version 1.0 from using its free, public videoconferencing chatrooms. As users upgraded to the commercially available version, some were frustrated to discover that others were downloading the trial version and using software registration keys readily supplied by some participants on White Pine's public chatrooms.

Acquisition 
White Pine Software was briefly renamed CUseeMe Networks, then merged with First Virtual Communications. The commercial standalone client was decommissioned, and an independent company used a version of the embedded commercial CU-SeeMe client renamed "CU" as part of a fee-based video chat service called CUworld. The commercial client and server environment were developed further and were renamed "Click To Meet" and launched along with an enhanced and more scalable version of the software MCU.

On March 15, 2005, Radvision Ltd. acquired all of the substantial assets and intellectual property of First Virtual Communications, including its 'Click to Meet' (formerly CUSeeMe) and Conference Server. Radvision was acquired by Avaya in June 2012. Spirent Communications acquired Radvision's Technology Business Unit from Avaya in July 2014. The descendants of the CU-SeeMe technology live on in part in the Radvision Scopia product line.

There is still a small but active community of users of the original CU-SeeMe releases. Although there have been no releases of software from the various incarnations of White Pine since roughly 2000, freeware alternatives are available for both the Windows and Macintosh platform.

See also 
 Trojan Room coffee pot

References

External links 
 Internet TV With CU-SeeMe (by Mickey Sattler, co-authored by John Lauer)
 Scientist on Tap (by Yvonne Marie Andres)

Groupware
Teleconferencing
Computer-related introductions in 1992
Videotelephony